The Fieseler Fi 99 Jungtiger was a German sports aircraft prototype, produced by Fieseler company. The aircraft was a low-wing two-seat aircraft with an enclosed cabin. It was powered by a Hirth HM 506A engine, producing .

Specifications

References

Further reading

1930s German sport aircraft
Fi 099
Single-engined tractor aircraft
Low-wing aircraft
Aircraft first flown in 1937